William Sutton (born August 31, 1967) is an American politician serving as a member of the Kansas House of Representatives from the 43rd district. Elected in November 2012, he assumed office on January 14, 2013.

Background 
Sutton was born and raised in Kansas City, Kansas. Outside of politics, Sutton has worked for Steel & Pipe Supply. He was elected to the Kansas House of Representatives in November 2012 and assumed office on January 14, 2013. During the 2017 legislative session, Sutton served as chair of the House General Government Budget. In 2019 and 2020, he served as chair of the House Elections Committee.

References 

1967 births
People from Kansas City, Kansas
Politicians from Kansas City, Kansas
Republican Party members of the Kansas House of Representatives
Living people
21st-century American politicians